Dato Chan Tien Ghee, more commonly known as TG, is a Malaysian businessman, who was the chairman of Cardiff City Football Club from May 2010 to March 2013.

Cardiff City
Chan Tien Ghee  became chairman on 27 May 2010. His aim was to get Cardiff into the Premier League and stated that Dave Jones would carry on being manager, whilst also hiring Gethin Jenkins from Newport Gwent Dragons to become Chief Executive of the club. However, Cardiff failed to get promoted at the end of his first season as chairman. He resigned the position as chairman in March 2013, to pursue other business opportunities.

Personal life
Tien Ghee is the father of the Malaysian footballer that was playing for Kelantan FA in 2011 season, Nicholas Chan.

References

External links
 Dato' Chan Tien Ghee appointed to City board

Living people
Malaysian businesspeople
Malaysian people of Chinese descent
Cardiff City F.C. directors and chairmen
Year of birth missing (living people)